"No Cars Go" is a song by Canadian indie rock band Arcade Fire. It is the fourth single released from the band's second full-length album, Neon Bible. The release date was due to be July 23, 2007 but the release was delayed to August 6, 2007.

Overview
The song title is taken from the solo project of former Arcade Fire member Brendan Reed. It first appeared on the band's self-released debut EP Arcade Fire and was re-recorded for Neon Bible.

Some pressings of the single list the B-side as "Surf City Eastern Block" and some list it as "Surf City Eastern Bloc".

Appearances
The song was featured in Eric Bana's 2009 documentary film Love The Beast. It is also featured in Mike Mo Capaldi's part in Fully Flared, a skateboarding video released by Lakai Limited Footwear in 2007.

In the UK, the song was also featured in Top Gears video montage/preview at the beginning of Series Ten, as well as in ITV's coverage of the UEFA Champions League in 2007/8. It has also featured on series 6 of Wheeler Dealers, a motoring programme on the Discovery Channel. In Italy it was used as the main theme of the soccer's Sunday TV-show "Quelli Che Il Calcio" hosted by Victoria Cabello, from September 18, 2011 to May 19, 2013 on Rai 2. It also was the soundtrack for the Danny MacAskill film The Slabs.

The song was jokingly referred to by Win Butler as "Yes Boats Yes" during their gig at the Hackney Empire on July 7, 2010.

Controversy
"No Cars Go" was used by Fox Sports in a post-halftime montage that aired during its coverage of Super Bowl XLII, and for similar segments in other NFL on Fox broadcasts throughout the 2007 season. Following the Super Bowl broadcast, the band said it would consider legal action against Fox, claiming that the network did not seek permission to use the song.

Track listing7" vinyl and digital:'
 "No Cars Go" (album version) – 5:39
 "Surf City Eastern Bloc" – 6:22

Chart performance

References

2007 singles
Arcade Fire songs
Songs written by Win Butler
Songs written by Régine Chassagne
2007 songs
Rough Trade Records singles
Merge Records singles
Songs about cars